Maghnia Hammadi (born 22 February 2000) is an Algerian weightlifter. She won the gold medal in her event at the 2017 African Weightlifting Championships held in Vacoas, Mauritius. She won the bronze medal in her event at the 2021 African Weightlifting Championships held in Nairobi, Kenya.

She won two medals at the 2022 Mediterranean Games held in Oran, Algeria. She won the silver medal in the women's 71 kg Snatch event and the bronze medal in the women's 71 kg Clean & Jerk event.

Achievements

References

External links 
 

Living people
2000 births
Place of birth missing (living people)
Algerian female weightlifters
Competitors at the 2022 Mediterranean Games
Mediterranean Games silver medalists for Algeria
Mediterranean Games bronze medalists for Algeria
Mediterranean Games medalists in weightlifting
21st-century Algerian women